The 3rd Prince of Wales' Canadian Dragoons was a cavalry regiment of the Non-Permanent Active Militia of the Canadian Militia (now the Canadian Army). In December 1936, the 3rd Dragoons were amalgamated with The Peterborough Rangers to form The Prince of Wales Rangers (Peterborough Regiment).

Lineage

3rd Prince of Wales' Canadian Dragoons 

 Originated on 30 April 1875, in Cobourg, Ontario, as the 3rd Provisional Regiment of Cavalry.
 Redesignated on 14 October 1881, as the 3rd Provisional Regiment of Cavalry, The Prince of Wales' Canadian Dragoons.
 Redesignated on 25 November 1892, as the 3rd Regiment of Cavalry, The Prince of Wales' Canadian Dragoons.
 Redesignated on 1 January 1893, as the 3rd The Prince of Wales' Canadian Dragoons.
 Amalgamated on 15 December 1936, with The Peterborough Rangers and the Headquarters and C Company of the 4th Machine Gun Battalion, CMGC, and Redesignated as The Prince of Wales Rangers (Peterborough Regiment) (MG).

History

Early History 
The 3rd Dragoons were originally formed on 30 April 1875, as the 3rd Provisional Regiment of Cavalry. It's Regimental Headquarters was established at Cobourg and had troops stationed at Cobourg, Port Hope and Peterborough.

On 14 October 1881, the regiment were Redesignated as the 3rd Provisional Regiment of Cavalry, The Prince of Wales’ Canadian Dragoons.

On 25 November 1892, the regiment were again Redesignated as the 3rd Regiment of Cavalry, The Prince of Wales' Canadian Dragoons.

On 1 January 1893, the regiment were for the final time Redesignated as the 3rd The Prince of Wales' Canadian Dragoons.

1920s-1930s 
During the post-WWI years, the 3rd Dragoons were authorized a Reserve unit under Canadian Militia General Order 185 dated 1 November 1920.

On 15 December 1936, as part of the 1936 Canadian Militia Reorganization, the 3rd Prince of Wales' Canadian Dragoons were Amalgamated with The Peterborough Rangers along with the Headquarters and "C" Company of the 4th Machine Gun Battalion, Canadian Machine Gun Corps, to form The Prince of Wales Rangers (Peterborough Regiment) (now the 50th Field Artillery Regiment (The Prince of Wales Rangers), RCA which is currently on the Supplementary Order of Battle).

Organization

3rd Provisional Regiment of Cavalry (30 April 1875) 

 No. 1 Troop (Cobourg) (first raised on 6 March 1856 as The Cobourg Volunteer Militia Troop of Cavalry. Redesignated on 28 August 1868 as 1st Troop, The Northumberland and Durham Squadron of Cavalry).
 No. 2 Troop (Port Hope, ON) (first raised on 3 September 1857 as 1st Troop of Volunteer Militia Cavalry of the County of Durham)
 No. 3 Troop
 No. 4 Troop (Peterborough, ON) (first raised 23 May 1872 as The Peterborough Militia Troop of Cavalry).

Notable Members 

 Captain Volney V. Ashford

See also 

 Prince of Wales's Regiment
 List of regiments of cavalry of the Canadian Militia (1900–1920)

References 

Dragoon regiments of Canada
Military units and formations of Ontario
Prince of Wales Rangers (Peterborough Regiment)
Military units and formations disestablished in 1936